Spinsters of San Francisco is a historical, social and philanthropic women's organization aimed at cultivating volunteerism in young women and helping the San Francisco, California community through fundraising.

Nonprofit by charter, the group consists of approximately 100 college-educated, unmarried women who sponsor and raise funds for a designated 501c(3) local nonprofit organization. The nonprofit is selected by vote of the membership each year.

Spinsters of San Francisco was founded in 1929 as a sister organization to the Bachelors of San Francisco.

History

Spinsters of San Francisco was founded on November 6, 1929, by Miss Patricia Tobin (Mrs. Sheldon Cooper), who hosted the first meeting to the founding membership of 35 women in the ballroom of her family's home, the de Young House at 1919 California Street, San Francisco. Patricia Tobin was the daughter of Joseph Tobin and Constance Tobin (née deYoung) and the granddaughter of Robert Tobin, founder of Hibernia Bank and M. H. de Young, founder of the San Francisco Chronicle and benefactor of the M.H. de Young Memorial Museum.

The first nonprofit partner was Travelers Aid San Francisco (now Compass Family Services), selected in 1957. Since then, many other charitable groups have been the beneficiaries of Spinsters of San Francisco patronage such as Youth Advocates Safe Place Program, The Girls After School Academy, Edgewood Center for Children and Families, and the Bayview Hunter's Point YMCA "Just for Girls Program".

The young socialite DeDe Halcyon Day in Armistead Maupin's Tales of the City series is a Spinsters of San Francisco alumnae. The Spinsters of San Francisco organization is mentioned multiple times within the series including mention that DeDe and husband Beauchamp met at the Spinsters of San Francisco Holiday Ball.

Today, Spinsters of San Francisco has a powerful and varied membership dedicated to work, community and networking. The membership is involved with many philanthropies and social organizations participating in other notable organizations such as Art Point, Bravo, Encore!, the Junior Committee to the Women's Board of the CPMC (Glitter Ball), the Junior League, and The Guardsmen.

Members of the organization (fondly referred to as Spinnies) are often found in the leading San Francisco lifestyle magazines such as the Nob Hill Gazette'''s Most Eligible List published annually.

Charitable projects

The membership of Spinsters of San Francisco currently supports Compass Family Services. Compass Family Services leads the way in helping San Francisco families facing homelessness secure stable housing and attain economic self-sufficiency and family well-being.

Compass Family Services will receive a donation from the 2022-2023 Spinsters of San Francisco fundraising events and Legacy Benefit, as well as receive individual Spinsters' one-on-one time through hands-on volunteering and individual donations.

Social occasions

Along with many invitation-only events and various social functions, Spinsters of San Francisco hosts three major fundraising events each year that are open to the public. These events feature entertainment, VIP hosted bars and are located at trendy venues in the city. Photography from the events can be seen in 7x7 Magazine, San Francisco Magazine, the San Francisco Chronicle, The Nob Hill Gazette'' and other leading lifestyle publications in the Bay Area.

The largest fundraising event of the Spinsters year is Legacy Benefit (formerly the Patron's Reception), held annually in the spring. Along with the current membership, active alumnae, members of the press, dedicated sponsors and civic leaders attend this highly anticipated, semi-formal event. This year's event will take place on Saturday, March 11, 2023 at the Fairmont San Francisco Swig Suite penthouse.

Membership

Historically, invitation to join Spinsters of San Francisco has been granted through rigorous processes. In the organization's early years, new members were only accepted when current members left the organization to be married. Today, membership remains exclusive and by invitation only.

Spinsters of San Francisco holds a membership recruitment period each spring where interested women may attend events designed to educate applicants about the organization. Requirements for membership consideration include the following: Applicants must currently live in the San Francisco Bay Area, be between the ages of 21 and 35, currently be unmarried, and have a college degree or trade certification.

Annually, Spinsters of San Francisco receives hundreds of applications for consideration.

References

External links
 Spinsters of San Francisco Website

Community-building organizations
Charities based in California
Organizations based in San Francisco
Social welfare charities based in the United States
1929 establishments in California
Women in California
Organizations established in 1929